Backford is a civil parish in Cheshire West and Chester, England.  It contains eleven buildings that are recorded in the National Heritage List for England as designated listed buildings.  Apart from the village of Backford, the parish is rural.  The listed buildings include the village church and associated structures, Backford Hall and its Lodge, a former vicarage, a farmhouse and associated buildings, and two guideposts.

Key

Buildings

See also
Listed buildings in Capenhurst
Listed buildings in Croughton
Listed buildings in Little Stanney
Listed buildings in Mickle Trafford
Listed buildings in Stoak
Listed buildings in Upton-by-Chester
Listed buildings in Wervin

References
Citations

Sources

Listed buildings in Cheshire West and Chester
Lists of listed buildings in Cheshire